Aringo  is a frazione of Montereale,  in the Province of L'Aquila in the Abruzzo, region of Italy.

Frazioni of Montereale